Antonio Porta (the pen-name of Leo Paolazzi) was an author and poet and one of the founders of the Italian literary movement Gruppo 63.

Biography
Antonio Porta was born Leo Paolazzi in Vicenza in 1935. In 1958, he became an editor of the literary magazine Il Verri under Luciano Anceschi. During his time as an editor, he wrote a collection of poems to be included in the anthology I novissimi (1961), which included works by Elio Pagliarani, Edoardo Sanguineti, Alfredo Giuliani, and Nanni Balestrini.

Gruppo 63
From his experience with Il verri, Porta began collaborating with an avant-garde Italian movement called Gruppo 63. While working to develop their ideas, he travelled to the conventions they held in Palermo, Reggio Emilia, La Sapienza, and Fano.

From 1963 to 1967, Porta was actively involved in the editing of another avant-garde magazine Malebolge from Reggio Emilia. In these years he also began working in visual poetry, participating in exhibitions in Padova, Rome, Milan, and London. His work that is most associated with this period is Zero (1963).

Later career 

He contributed as a literary critic for renowned Italian newspapers such as Il Corriere della Sera and Il Giorno and collaborated on Tuttolibri, Panorama, and L'Europeo. He was the director and active editor of the monthly Alfabeta and La Gola.

From 1982 to 1988, he taught at the D'Annunzio University of Chieti–Pescara, then at Yale, the University of Pavia, the Sapienza University of Rome, and the University of Bologna.

Bibliography 

 Calendario, Schwartz, Milan, 1956, under the pen name Leo Paolazzi
 La palpebra rovesciata, Azimuth, Milan, 1960
 I novissimi, il verri edition, Milan, 1961
 Zero, numbered edition, in proprio, Milan, 1963
 Aprire, poems, All'Insegna del Pesce d'Oro, Milan, 1964
 I rapporti, poems, Feltrinelli Editore, Milan, 1966
 Partita, novel, Feltrinelli Editore, Milan, 1967
 Cara, poems, Feltrinelli Editore, Milan, 1969
 Metropolis, poems, Feltrinelli Editore, Milan, 1971 (finalist for the Viareggio Prize).
 Week-end, poems, Cooperativa Scrittori Editrice, Rome 1974
 La presa di potere di Ivan lo sciocco, play,  Einaudi Editore, Turin, 1974
 Quanto ho da dirvi, collection of all his poetry from 1958 to 1975, Feltrinelli Editore, Milano, 1977
 Il re del magazzino, novel, Arnoldo Mondadori Editore, Milan, 1978
 Pin Pidìn, poems of today for kids (with Giovanni Raboni), Feltrinelli Editore, Milan,1978.
 Passi Passaggi, poems, Arnoldo Mondadori Editore, Milan, 1980 (winner of the " Val di Comino " award, finalist for the D'Annunzio Prize)
 Se fosse tutto un tradimento, short story, Guanda Editore, Milan, 1981
 L'aria della fine, poems, Lunarionuovo, Catania, 1982 (winner of Gandovere Prize - Franciacorta)
 Emilio, small poems for children, Emme Edizioni, Milan, 1982
 La poesia che dice no, film for TV (RAI, Rai Tre, directed by Gianni Jannelli) La Spezia, 1983
 Invasioni, poems, Arnoldo Mondadori Editore, Milan, 1984 (winner of the Viareggio Prize, and Città di Latina Prize)
 Nel fare poesia, anthologia with an introduction on his method of writing, Sansoni, Florence, 1985
 La stangata persiana, play, Corpo 10, Milan, 1985
 La festa del cavallo, play, Corpo 10, Milan, 1986
 Melusina, una ballata e diario, Crocetti Editore, Milan, 1987
 Il giardiniere contro il becchino, Arnoldo Mondadori Editore, Milan, 1988 (winner of the Carducci Prize, the Acireale Prize, and the Stefanile Prize)
 Partorire in chiesa, short story, Libri Scheiwiller, Milan, 1990
 Il Progetto Infinito, edited by Giovanni Raboni, Quaderni Pier Paolo Pasolini, Rome, 1991 (distributed by Garzanti)
 Los(t) angeles, unedited novel, Vallecchi Editore, Florence, 1996
 Poesie 1956-1988 edited by Niva Lorenzini, Oscar Mondadori, Milan, 1998
 Yellow, unedited poems, edited by Niva Lorenzini, Mondadori, Milan, 2002
 Tutte le poesie, edited by Niva Lorenzini, Garzanti, Milan, 2009
 La scomparsa del corpo, collection of all his short novels, Manni Editori, Lecce, 2010
 Piercing the Page: Selected Poems 1958-1989", Edited with an introduction by Gian Maria Annovi and an essay by Umberto Eco, Otis - Seismicity, Los Angeles, 2012

External links
 Comune (municipality) of Bologna information for a convention on Antonio Porta 
Video clip of the poem Devo finire un sogno su videopoesia - http://vimeo.com/1143854
Piercing the Page 

1935 births
1989 deaths
Italian dramatists and playwrights
Italian male poets
People from Vicenza
Gruppo 63
20th-century Italian poets
20th-century Italian dramatists and playwrights
Italian male dramatists and playwrights
Academic staff of the D'Annunzio University of Chieti–Pescara
Yale University faculty
Academic staff of the University of Pavia
Academic staff of the Sapienza University of Rome
Academic staff of the University of Bologna
20th-century Italian male writers